Brian M. Cresta (born April 22, 1969 in Stoneham, Massachusetts) is an American politician who currently serves on the Middleton, Massachusetts Board of Selectmen. He previously served as a member of the Massachusetts House of Representatives from 1995 to 2001 and as a member of the Wakefield, Massachusetts Board of Selectmen from 1991 to 1994. From 1998 to 2001 he was also the Chairman of the Massachusetts Republican Party.

Wakefield Board of Selectmen
Cresta was elected in 1991 to the Wakefield Board of Selectmen. At the age of 21 he became the youngest Selectman ever elected in Wakefield's history. During that time Cresta worked as a Legislative Aide to State Senator Richard Tisei.

Massachusetts House of Representatives
In 1994 he was elected to the Massachusetts House of Representatives, defeating fellow Selectman Peter Melanson. The district comprised the entire towns of Wakefield and Middleton, as well as 3 of the 4 precincts in Lynnfield. In 1996 Cresta won re-election with 63% of the vote, defeating Thomas Markham, III. In 1998 and 2000 Cresta ran unopposed.

US Department of Health and Human Services
In 2001 Cresta resigned from the House of Representatives to accept an appointment by President George W. Bush at the United States Department of Health and Human Services.

Middleton Board of Selectmen
In 2010 Cresta was elected to the Board of Selectmen in Middleton, Massachusetts, a community he once represented during his tenure in the House of Representatives.

References 

1969 births
Merrimack College alumni
Living people
Massachusetts Republican Party chairs
Members of the Massachusetts House of Representatives
People from Stoneham, Massachusetts
People from Wakefield, Massachusetts
People from Middleton, Massachusetts